Hougomont was the name of a four-masted steel barque built in Greenock, Scotland in 1897 by Scotts Shipbuilding & Engineering Co. In 1924 she was purchased by Gustav Erikson's shipping company in Mariehamn, Åland, Finland.  She was used for transport and schooling ship for young sailors until 1932 when a squall completely broke her rig on the Southern Ocean and she was sunk as breakwater near the town of Stenhouse Bay in South Australia.
''Hougomont had a crew of 24 men. The name "Hougomont" is derived from Château d'Hougoumont where the Battle of Waterloo was fought. While seaworthy she sailed to Peru, Florida, Canada, Australia, England, Ireland, and Sweden among other destinations. She had two sister ships, Nivelle (stranded in 1906) and Archibald Russell.

HistoryHougomont was unfortunate and damaged on several occasions while at sea.

In March 1903 she ran aground at Allonby on the Cumbrian coast. She was bound for Liverpool from San Francisco and had been driven off course by heavy weather. Her cargo included 32,000 cases of tinned pears and 24,000 cases of salmon, which the villagers of Allonby 'harvested' from the shore.

In 1910 nine men were washed overboard when a rogue wave hit her stern in a hurricane. Five of the men were washed back on board by the next wave, but the remaining four were never seen again. In November 1927 her rig sustained damage in the Bay of Biscay, and she took refuge at the port of Lisbon, Portugal, where she was repaired in order to continue her voyage to Melbourne, Australia. In 1931 several of her sails were torn to shreds in a storm near Cape Horn.

She was at the time on her 111th day at sea, carrying deadweight, on her way to a port in Spencer Gulf, west of Adelaide, Australia. The wreckage of the damaged rig battered the ship severely and it took the crew 30 hours to free her from it. She was coincidentally spotted by a steamer that wirelessly telegraphed about the distress to Adelaide, and the steam tug Wato was sent to assist. However, by the time Wato had reached Hougomont, Hougomont′s crew had managed to build a jury rig and she was sailing slowly forward. Her captain, Ragnar Lindholm, refused all offers of assistance from the tug as he wanted to avoid salvage fees.

Nineteen days later, on 8 May 1932, she reached the anchorage immediately off Semaphore in Adelaide. It was estimated that she was damaged beyond repair, so everything valuable on her was removed and shipped to Mariehamn on Herzogin Cecilie in December 1932. She was sold to the Waratah Gypsum Company for scuttling as a breakwater.  In January 1933, Wato'' towed her to Stenhouse Bay for scuttling. She was scuttled there on 8 January 1933.

Today she lies  underwater in Stenhouse Bay. Her stern and prow are still standing somewhat upright, but most of her hull has collapsed. Her figurehead, a blonde lady dressed in a white gown, is displayed in Åland Maritime Museum in Mariehamn.

Technical facts
Tonnage: 2074 grt 
Dimensions: 89 x 13,2 x 7,3 m
Material: steel
Date of launch: 3 June 1897
Deadweight tonnage: 4000

See also
List of shipwrecks of Australia

References

Ships built on the River Clyde
1897 ships
Individual sailing vessels
Maritime incidents in 1903
Maritime incidents in 1910
Maritime incidents in 1927
Maritime incidents in 1931
Maritime incidents in 1932
Maritime incidents in 1933
Shipwrecks of South Australia
Investigator Strait
Scuttled vessels